Leonard Kibrick (September 6, 1924 – January 4, 1993) was an American child actor.

Career 
Kibrick was most notable for appearing in the Our Gang short subjects series from 1934 to 1936, usually portraying the villain. Kibrick first appeared in the 1934 Our Gang short For Pete's Sake. He appeared in many more Our Gang shorts for the next two years. His final Our Gang short was the 1936 The Lucky Corner. His role as the bully in the series was taken over by Tommy Bond (as "Butch") in 1937, and Leonard's younger brother Sidney Kibrick portrayed Butch's sidekick, "The Woim".

Death
A native of Minneapolis, Minnesota, Kibrick died of cancer on January 4, 1993.

Filmography

References

External links
 
 
 
 

American male child actors
Male actors from Minneapolis
Deaths from cancer in California
1924 births
1993 deaths
20th-century American male actors
Our Gang